U-70 may refer to one of the following German submarines:

 , a Type U 66 submarine launched in 1915 and that served in the First World War until surrendered on 20 November 1918; broken up at Bo'ness in 1920–21
 During the First World War, Germany also had these submarines with similar names:
 , a Type UB III submarine launched in 1917 and disappeared after 5 May 1918
 , a Type UC II submarine launched in 1916 and sunk on 28 August 1918
 , a Type VIIC submarine that served in the Second World War until sunk on 7 March 1941

Submarines of Germany

de:U 70
nl:U 70
pl:U-70
ru:U-70